The women's competition in the heavyweight (– 75 kg) division was staged on November 27 and November 28, 2009.

Schedule

Medalists

Records

Results

New records

References
Results 

- Women's 75 kg, 2009 World Weightlifting Championships
World